Eugamandus ricarti is a species of longhorn beetles of the subfamily Lamiinae. It was described by Micheli in 2003, and is known from Puerto Rico.

References

Beetles described in 2003
Acanthocinini